Dynamite is the third studio album by Swedish singer-songwriter Stina Nordenstam. It was originally released by Telegram Records Stockholm in 1996.

Track listing

Personnel
Credits adapted from liner notes.

 Stina Nordenstam – vocals, guitar
 Johan Dereborn – guitar
 Anders Lövgren – guitar
 Thomas Tjärnqvist – guitar
 Jonas Sjöblom – flute, drums, percussion
 Jacob Ruthberg – violin, viola
 Fredrik Burstedt – violin
 Martin Stensson – violin
 Magnus Ekenborn – cello
 Anna Wallgren – cello
 Emelie Gemzel – flute
 Henrik Hilsson – horn
 Johan Soderlund – clarinet
 Jesper Harrysson – oboe 
 Morten Östergaard – bassoon

Charts

References

External links
 

1996 albums
Stina Nordenstam albums
East West Records albums